Alexandrina Road (formerly Strathalbyn–Goolwa Road) is a South Australian secondary road, connecting the towns of Strathalbyn and Goolwa. It has been designated part of route B37.

Major intersections
Alexandrina Road is entirely contained within the Alexandrina Council local government area.

See also

References

Roads in South Australia